Fungi – "Fungi" is plural for "fungus". A fungus is any member of the group of eukaryotic organisms that includes unicellular microorganisms such as yeasts and molds, as well as multicellular fungi that produce familiar fruiting forms known as mushrooms. Biologists classify these organisms as a kingdom, Fungi, the second highest taxonomic rank of living organism beneath the Eukaryota domain; other kingdoms include plants, animals, protists, and bacteria. One difference that places fungi in a different kingdom is that their cell walls contain chitin, unlike the cell walls of plants, bacteria and some protists. Similar to animals, fungi are heterotrophs, that is, they acquire their food by absorbing dissolved molecules, typically by secreting digestive enzymes into their environment. Growth is their means of mobility, except for spores (a few of which are flagellated), which may travel through air or water. Fungi function as the principal decomposers in ecological systems.

Types of fungi 
 By form
 Molds
 Aspergillus (list)
 Fusarium (list)
 Mushrooms
 Agaricus (list)
 Amanita (list)
 Armillaria (list)
 Boletus (list)
 Coprinellus (list)
 Coprinopsis (list)
 Cortinarius (list)
 Entoloma (list)
 Gymnopilus (list)
 Gymnopus (list)
 Hebeloma (list)
 Hygrocybe (list)
 Hygrophorus (list)
 Inocybe (list)
 Lactarius (list)
 Lactifluus (list)
 Lepiota (list)
 Leucoagaricus (list)
 Leccinum (list)
 Marasmius (list)
 Pleurotus (list)
 Yeasts
 Other
 Cyathus (list)
 By activity
 Carnivorous fungi
 Pathogenic fungi
 Poisonous fungi
 Poisonous mushrooms
 List of poisonous mushrooms
 List of deadly mushrooms
 By aspect
 Bioluminescent fungi
 Deadly fungi
 By use
 Medicinal fungi
 Edible fungi
 Edible molds
 Penicillium camemberti – used in the production of Brie cheese and Camembert cheese
 Penicillium glaucum – used in making Gorgonzola cheese
 Penicillium roqueforti – used in making Roquefort cheese, Danish Blue cheese, and also recently Gorgonzola
 Edible mushrooms

Symbiotic life forms of which fungi are a part 

 Lichen – composite organism that arises from algae or cyanobacteria living among filaments of multiple fungi in a symbiotic relationship. Lichens are classified by the fungal component. Lichen species are given the same scientific name (binomial name) as the fungus species in the lichen. Lichens are being integrated into the classification schemes for fungi.
 Caloplaca (list)
 Cladonia (list)
 Lecanora (list)

Study of fungi 
Mycology
 Branches of mycology
 Mycotoxicology

History of fungi 

 History of mycology

Fungi-related publications 

 Books about fungi

 Mycology journals
 Fungal Biology
 Fungal Genetics and Biology
 Medical Mycology
 Mycologia
 Mycological Progress
 Mycoscience
 Mycoses
 Mycotaxon
 Sydowia

Persons influential in fungi 
 List of mycologists

See also 

 Outline of biology
 Outline of lichens

References

External links 

 Tree of Life web project: Fungi
 Mushroom Observer (mushroomobserver.org), a collaborative fungus recording and identification project

Fungi
Fungi